Daldinia is a genus of fungi in the family Hypoxylaceae.

The genus name of Daldinia is in honour of Agostino Daldini (1817-1895), a Swiss clergyman and botanist, a Capuchin monk from Locarno.

The genus was circumscribed by Vincenzo de Cesati in Comment. Soc. Crittog. Ital. 1: Issue 50 on pages 197-360 in 1863.

Species

 D. angolensis
 D. bakeri
 D. bambusicola
 D. brachysperma
 D. caldariorum
 D. childiae
 D. clavata
 D. concentrica
 D. cudonia
 D. cuprea
 D. dennisii
 D. eschscholzii
 D. fissa
 D. gelatinosa
 D. graminis
 D. grandis
 D. lloydii
 D. loculata
 D. macrospora
 D. mexicana
 D. novae-zelandiae
 D. occidentalis
 D. petriniae
 D. placentiformis
 D. sacchari
 D. simulans
 D. singularis
 D. vernicosa

References

External links
 

Xylariales
Taxa named by Giuseppe De Notaris
Taxa described in 1863